Legal Information Centre for Human Rights is a non-governmental organisation based in Estonia, according to Hanne-Margret Birckenbach, is "particularly involved in promoting the concerns of Russian-speaking inhabitants and with outstanding contacts to West European research institutes", which "is considered as one of the few attempts in Estonia to develop competence in the understanding of human rights issues, whereas Estonian judges or the legal education system, for instance, have remained uninterested". It participates at the EU FRA's Fundamental Rights Platform and is FRA's RAXEN focus group for Estonia, is member of AEDH and ENAR as well as supports UNITED network.

Its sponsors include the European Commission, Tallinn city, and the British, Russian, Norwegian, US, and Dutch embassies.

In 2009, the Estonian Internal Security Service has published statements on the centre's director Semjonov, claiming that:

Amnesty International evaluated these statements in the following way:

In a project financially backed by the Russkiy Mir Foundation, the centre has published the book "Russian Schools of Estonia. Compendium of Materials" with the aim of creating conditions for the preservation of the existing public system of separate Russian language schools within Estonia. The current system is described as a legacy of the Soviet period when the education system was segregated with Russian settlers attending separate nursery schools, primary schools, and secondary schools with different curricula and instruction was held exclusively in Russian while the natives attended public schools with instruction in both Estonian and Russian On the other hand, the Estonian minister of education Aaviksoo, in rebuking claims that the school reforms were unconstitutional (the LICHR book claims Russian school closures are unconstitutional), stated that Russian schools in Estonia have existed for more than 100 years, including the first independence time between the world wars, and will continue to exist.

The UN Forum on Minority Issues considers that "The creation and development of classes and schools providing education in minority languages should not be considered impermissible segregation, if the assignment to such classes and schools is of a voluntary nature". The "establishment or maintenance, for religious or linguistic reasons, of separate educational systems or institutions" as such is not considered discriminatory by the Convention against Discrimination in Education if participation in such systems or attendance at such institutions is optional, and if the education provided conforms to such standards as may be laid down or approved by the competent authorities.

References

External links
 

1994 establishments in Estonia
Organizations established in 1994
Human rights organizations based in Estonia
Organizations based in Tallinn